The Irish Women's Amateur Open Championship is the women's national amateur stroke play golf championship of Ireland. It was first played in 1993 and is currently organised by Golf Ireland.

Winners

Source:

References

External links
Golf Ireland

Amateur golf tournaments
Golf tournaments in Ireland
1993 establishments in Ireland
Recurring sporting events established in 1993